Emma Herland (1856 – 1947) was a French painter.

Biography
Herland was born in Cherbourg and became a pupil of Jules Lefebvre and Benjamin Constant. She first exhibited at the Paris Salon in 1879. She was a member of the Société des Artistes Français from 1886 onwards and won an honourable mention in 1901.

Her work Children Eating Soup in a Charity School was included in the book Women Painters of the World. Herland died in Quimper.

References

1856 births
1947 deaths
People from Cherbourg-Octeville
French women painters
19th-century French painters
19th-century French women artists
20th-century French painters
20th-century French women artists